The West Elks AVA is an American Viticultural Area located in Delta County, Colorado in and around the towns of Cedaredge, Hotchkiss and Paonia. It is one of two AVA's in the state. Some of the highest altitude vineyards in the northern hemisphere are planted within the AVA. The surrounding mountains limit access to the area, resulting in a far more secluded wine industry when compared to its nearby neighbor to the northwest, the Grand Valley AVA.

There are around a dozen wineries/vineyards in the West Elks.

References

External links
  TTB AVA Map

American Viticultural Areas
Colorado wine
Geography of Delta County, Colorado
2001 establishments in Colorado